The 2012 Minnesota Senate election was held in the U.S. state of Minnesota on November 6, 2012, to elect members to the Senate of the 88th and 89th Minnesota Legislatures. A primary election was held in several districts on August 14, 2012.

The Minnesota Democratic–Farmer–Labor Party (DFL) won a majority of seats, defeating the majority of the Republican Party of Minnesota. This was the first election for the Republicans since it won a majority of seats in the 2010 election, its first since the return of partisan elections to the Senate in 1976. The new Legislature convened on January 8, 2013.

Primary election results

General election

Opinion polling

Results

District results

See also
 Minnesota House of Representatives election, 2012
 Minnesota gubernatorial election, 2010
 Minnesota elections, 2012

References

External links
 Color shaded map showing winning margin by district (PDF) from 2012 Election Maps, Minnesota Secretary of State

2012 Minnesota elections
Minnesota Senate elections
Minnesota Senate